Parnara ogasawarensis is a butterfly in the family Hesperiidae (Hesperiinae). It is endemic to the Bonin Islands of Japan.

References

Hesperiinae
Butterflies described in 1906